Bom Viver is a settlement in Príncipe Island in São Tomé and Príncipe. Its population is 299 (2008 est.).

Population history

References

Populated places in the Autonomous Region of Príncipe